Richard Gable Hovannisian (born November 9, 1932) is an Armenian American historian and professor emeritus at the University of California, Los Angeles. He is known mainly for his four-volume history of the First Republic of Armenia.

Biography

Background
Hovannisian was born and raised in Tulare, California into a family of Armenian genocide survivors. His father, Gaspar Gavroian, was born in 1901 in the village of Bazmashen (Pazmashen; now Sarıçubuk, Elâzığ), near Kharpert in the Ottoman Empire. Fleeing the genocide of 1915, he moved to the United States by 1920 and changed his last name from Gavroian to Hovannisian, after his father's name, Hovhannes. In 1926, Kaspar married Siroon (Sarah) Nalbandian, also a child of genocide survivors. Their two sons were born in 1928 (John) and 1930 (Ralph). Richard Gable Hovannisian (named after Clark Gable) was born last on November 9, 1932.

Hovannisian married Vartiter Kotcholosian in 1957 at the Holy Trinity Armenian Church of Fresno. They had four children, Raffi, Armen, Ani, and Garo. Raffi later went on to become the first Foreign Minister of Armenia and is currently an opposition politician.

Education and career

Hovannisian received his B.A. in history (1954) from the University of California, Berkeley, and his M.A. in history (1958) and his Ph.D. (1966) from University of California, Los Angeles (UCLA).  He was also an associate professor of history at Mount St. Mary's College, Los Angeles, from 1966 to 1969, having joined UCLA in 1962. A Rankean by training, Hovannisian's scholarly work early on was focused on the history of the First Republic of Armenia (1918–20). His Ph.D. dissertation, originally envisioned to encompass its entire history, was published in 1967 as Armenia on the Road to Independence and would serve as a prologue to the four volumes (1971-1996) that he would eventually publish on the history of the republic. These volumes were generally well-received among scholarly circles.

In 1986, Hovannisian was appointed as the first holder of the Armenian Educational Foundation Endowed Chair in Modern Armenian History at UCLA. Hovannisian is a Guggenheim Fellow who has received numerous honors for his scholarship, civic activities, and advancement of Armenian Studies. His biographical entries are included in Who's Who in America and Who's Who in the World among other scholarly and literary reference works. Hovannisian serves on the board of directors of nine scholarly and civic organizations, including the Facing History and Ourselves Foundation; the International Institute on the Holocaust and Genocide; International Alert; the Foundation for Research on Armenian Architecture; and the Armenian National Institute (ANI). He received the UCLA Alumni Association's 2010-2011 "Most Inspiring Teacher" award.

Since 2000, Hovannisian has overseen and edited a number of individual studies on the former Armenian-populated towns and cities of the Ottoman Empire.

In 2014, he became adjust professor at USC "with the intention of advising on the Shoah Foundation’s integration of the Armenian Film Foundation’s collection of genocide survivor interviews." He then in 2018 donated his own interviews to USC Shoah Foundation’s Visual History Archive. The 1000 interviews are titled the Richard G. Hovannisian Armenian Genocide Oral History Collection, and is "the largest existing collection about the Armenian Genocide" according to the foundation. The interviews were first recorded in 1972, when he had students in California tape Armenian genocide survivors throughout the Southern part of the state, as well as other states and countries. In the 1990s and 2000s, as the survivors died off, the interviews focused instead on the children of survivors, with the last class taking place in 2011.

In February 2020, Hovannisian received the Armenian Genocide Education Legacy award at the 4th Annual Armenian Genocide Education Awards Luncheon put on by The Armenian National Committee of America – Western Region’s Education Committee.

Political views
In a 2006 interview Hovannisian criticized the government of then President Robert Kocharyan for its authoritarian nature and added that Armenia "must not become a failed state." Hovannisian partook in the protests following the 2013 presidential election in Armenia in which his son, Raffi, came in second according to official results.

Selected works

The Armenian Holocaust, Cambridge, Massachusetts, Armenian Heritage Press (1980) 
The Armenian People from Ancient to Modern Times, 2 vols. New York: St. Martin's Press, 1997 (editor) 
Remembrance and Denial: The Case of the Armenian Genocide. Detroit: Wayne State University Press, 1998 (editor)

UCLA conference series proceedings 
The UCLA conference series titled "Historic Armenian Cities and Provinces" has been organized by Hovannisian, as the Holder of the Armenian Educational Foundation Chair in Modern Armenian History.  The conference proceedings (edited by Hovannisian) that have so far been published (in Costa Mesa, CA, by Mazda Publishers) are:
 Armenian Van/Vaspurakan (2000) 
 Armenian Baghesh/Bitlis and Taron/Mush (2001) 
 Armenian Tsopk/Kharpert (2002) 
 Armenian Karin/Erzerum (2003) 
 Armenian Sebastia/Sivas and Lesser Armenia (2004) 
 Armenian Tigranakert/Diarbekir and Edessa/Urfa (2006) 
 Armenian Cilicia (2008)  (together with Simon Payaslian)
 Armenian Pontus: The Trebizond-Black Sea Communities (2009) 
 Armenian Constantinople (2010)  (together with Simon Payaslian)
 Armenian Kars and Ani   (2011)
 Armenian Smyrna/Izmir   (2012)
 Armenian Kesaria/Kayseri and Cappadocia (2013)
 Armenian Communities of Asia Minor (2014)

Articles

References

Bibliography
 (the author is a grandson of Richard Hovannisian)

External links 
Full bibliography
National Academy of Sciences of the Republic of Armenia

1932 births
Living people
21st-century American historians
21st-century American male writers
American male non-fiction writers
American writers of Armenian descent
Armenian studies scholars
Ethnic Armenian historians
Historians from California
Historians of Armenia
Historians of the Armenian genocide
Mount St. Mary's University (Los Angeles) faculty
University of California, Berkeley alumni
University of California, Los Angeles alumni